Gymnothorax panamensis, the masked moray or Panamic moray, is a moray eel found in the eastern Pacific Ocean.

References

panamensis
Fish described in 1876